Kevin Killen (born October 22, 1959) is a music producer, engineer, and mixer. His work has been recognized by multiple awards and nominations, and he has worked with a range of recording artists including Shakira, Peter Gabriel, U2, David Bowie, Elvis Costello, Tori Amos, Kate Bush, Jewel, Bon Jovi and Shawn Colvin.

Career
Some of Killen's earliest credits include engineering U2's The Unforgettable Fire and Peter Gabriel's So along with the production/engineering team of Brian Eno and Daniel Lanois.

Among Killen's more recent credits include, mixing Sugarland's multi-platinum Love on the Inside featuring three chart singles in "All I Want to Do", "Already Gone" and "It Happens", all Number One hits on the Billboard country singles charts. In 2014, he mixed Suzanne Vega's latest release Tales from the Realm of the Queen of Pentacles and recorded David Bowie's single "Sue (Or in a Season of Crime)" from his release, Nothing Has Changed.

Perhaps one of his most notable productions is the original soundtrack to the popular music film, The Commitments.  Kevin co-produced and mixed that album.

Awards and nominations
Killen won 5 Grammys for his contributions to the Shakira album Oral Fixation, Vol. 1 (2005)  He has received Grammy nominations for Best Jazz Instrumental Category for his work on Allen Toussaint's The Bright Mississippi (2009) and Best Engineered Album, Non-Classical, for Seth Glier's The Trouble With People (2012). In 2013 he received a Juno Award for recording and mixing Johnny Reid's Fire It Up CD as Best Country Album.
At the 59th Annual Grammy Awards held in February 2017, Kevin was awarded a Grammy for co-producing and mixing Yo-Yo Ma & the Silk Road Ensemble’s Sing Me Home for Best World Music Album. In addition, he was awarded the Grammy Award for Best Engineered Album, Non-Classical for David Bowie’s final studio album – Blackstar and a third Grammy as Blackstar took honour for Best Alternative Music Album.

References

External links
Kevin Killen management biography
Kevin Killen credits at AllMusic

1959 births
Living people
American audio engineers